Ordnance Annex is a US naval base in the United States territory of  Guam. It used to be known as Naval Magazine, Guam. The base is on the south-central section of the island.

The entirety of the man-made Fena Lake, which provides drinking water to the southern part of the island, is within the boundaries of Ordnance Annex. It is the original location of the latte stones relocated to Latte Stone Park in Hagåtña.

See also
 US military installations in Guam

References

Buildings and structures in Guam
Military installations of the United States in Guam